Persatuan Sepakbola Indonesia Samarinda United (simply known as Persisam United) is an Indonesian football club based in Samarinda, East Kalimantan. They currently compete in the Liga 3.

History
Founded in 2021, Persisam United made club debut into Indonesian football by joining the third-tier league Indonesia Liga 3 in 2021. Persisam United is an phoenix club of Persisam Putra Samarinda after the original club was moved their homebase and changed the name to Bali United in 2015.

Persisam United qualified for the national round of Liga 3 after being runner-up in the 2021 Liga 3 East Kalimantan zone. they lost to Persikutim East Kutai in the final match with a score 2–1. Successfully qualifying in the preliminary round in Liga 3 East Kalimantan zone. Persisam United made preparations to appear in the national round, they will meet clubs from other provinces, Persisam United joined in Group F which will take place in Ciamis Regency starts on 6 February 2022, In Group F, Persisam United will face Mataram Utama, PS Sandeq and Citeureup Raya.

Honours
 Liga 3 East Kalimantan
 Runner-up: 2021

References

External links
Persisam United Instagram 
Persisam United Facebook 

Football clubs in Indonesia
 Football clubs in East Kalimantan
Association football clubs established in 2021
2021 establishments in Indonesia